This is a list of important publications in pedagogy, organized by field.

Some reasons why a particular publication might be regarded as important:
Topic creator – A publication that created a new topic
Breakthrough – A publication that changed scientific knowledge significantly
Influence – A publication which has significantly influenced the world or has had a massive impact on the teaching of pedagogy.

Instructional theory publications 
 Friedrich Schiller, On the Aesthetic Education of Man, 1794
 Maria Montessori, Il Metodo della Pedagogia Scientifica Applicato All'educazione Infantile Nelle Case dei Bambini, 1909
 Maria Montessori, Antropologia Pedagogica, 1910
 Maria Montessori, Manuale di Pedagogia Scientifica, 1921
 John Dewey, Experience and Education, 1938
 Paulo Freire, Pedagogy of the Oppressed, 1968 (English translation: 1970)
 Ivan Illich, Deschooling Society, 1971
 David L. Kirp, The Sandbox Investment, 2007

See also 
 List of important publications in philosophy
 List of important publications in anthropology
 List of important publications in economics

References 

Lists of publications
Publications